Anjaan Hai Koi is a 1969 Hindi movie directed by Babubhai Mistri. The film stars Feroz Khan and Nalini. The film's music is by Usha Khanna with lyrics by Asad Bhopali .

Cast
Feroz Khan... Anand
Nalini... Sandhya
Helen... Bijli
Aruna Irani... Seema 
Mohan Choti... Badal - The Cook 
Agha... Advocate Narayan Das
Jayshree T.
Polson
Birbal

Soundtrack
"Mehbooba Dilwalon Ki" - Mohammed Rafi
"Anjaan Hai Koi" - Mohammed Rafi
"Baar Baar Mana Kiya" - Suman Kalyanpur
"Shaam Dekho Dhal Rahi Hai" - Mohammed Rafi, Usha Khanna
"Matka Haay Re Haay Matka" - Mahendra Kapoor, Jaspal Singh
"Gilason Me Jo Doobe" - Asha Bhosle

References

External links

Films scored by Usha Khanna
1960s Hindi-language films
1969 films